Alternative Tentacles is an independent record label established in 1979 in San Francisco, California. It was used by Dead Kennedys for the self-produced single "California Über Alles". After realizing the potential for an independent label, they released records for other bands as well. Dead Kennedys guitarist East Bay Ray and vocalist Jello Biafra formed Alternative Tentacles, but Biafra became the sole owner in the mid-1980s. Alternative Tentacles no longer owns the rights to Dead Kennedys recordings after a 2000 lawsuit.

History
Alternative Tentacles subsequently released records of other bands of the alternative/punk scene including releasing records (which were later released by other labels) by bands including The Dicks, 7 Seconds, and the Butthole Surfers. In 1981, Alternative Tentacles released the compilation Let Them Eat Jellybeans!.

Some of the best known bands that have released albums through Alternative Tentacles are Dead Kennedys, NoMeansNo, D.O.A., and Alice Donut.

In addition to musical acts, Alternative Tentacles also publishes spoken word albums, many by Jello Biafra himself. Another common theme of Alternative Tentacles records over the years has been the artwork of Winston Smith, which has appeared on many of their records, catalogs, posters and shirts. Smith also designed the Alternative Tentacles logo.

In April 2019 Kerrang ran a long form feature called "An Oral History of Alternative Tentacles". Within that article were quotes on the modern political stance of the label:

"Alternative Tentacles has a long history of making political statements. Two of their biggest selling T-shirts since America’s 2016 election are the ‘Nazi Trumps Fuck Off’ and ‘Trump Hates Me’ designs. Anti-Trump sentiments have also been expressed on the A.T Batcast podcast. So it came as a surprise to the staff to find out that there are Trump supporters who are also fans of A.T. “They think that Trump is punk,” Chris sighs. “He’s the chaos factor, so they see him as someone who’s fucking up the government. It’s amazing to me that people are surprised Jello is anti-Trump. Like, where have you been?!”
This label has questioned every single president – including Obama – since 1979,” adds Dominic, “and we will continue to do so. We support questioning everything, we are feminists, we like to challenge norms, and we aren’t afraid to take a side. I’ll say it again: If you support Trump, fuck you. That shaking things up you love so much is destroying people’s lives.”

In March 2020, Bandcamp ran a feature on their site entitled "The Lesser-Known Classics of Alternative Tentacles Records" as part of their label profile series.

United Kingdom branch

In the early 1980s, Alternative Tentacles opened an office in the UK (eventually settling at 64 Mountgrove Road in London) to release special editions of American punk records that were unavailable in Europe, many of which were licensed from other independent U.S. labels. Among these were releases by SST Records' groups Black Flag and Hüsker Dü, the Dischord Records compilation Flex Your Head, and an EP of tracks from the Bad Brains eponymous 1982 album, as well as U.K. pressings of all American Dead Kennedys releases. It was also a distribution hub for Elemental Records.

Legal trouble
In 1985, Los Angeles prosecutors charged Biafra with "distributing harmful matter to minors" for artwork contained in the Dead Kennedys album Frankenchrist. The artwork was a poster reproduction of the painting "Work 219: Landscape XX", also known as "Penis Landscape" by H.R. Giger. The case ended in a hung jury and charges were not re-filed. Biafra presented a detailed account of the trial on his second spoken word album, High Priest of Harmful Matter − Tales from the Trial.

In early 2000, the label and Biafra were named in a lawsuit brought by his former Dead Kennedys bandmates. The suit claimed that Biafra had failed to pay the band's members a decade's worth of royalties on the band's albums, totaling some $76,000. All sides agreed the initial underpayment of royalties was due to an accounting error. However, the jury ultimately ruled that Alternative Tentacles and Biafra were "guilty of malice, oppression and fraud" by not promptly informing his former bandmates of the matter and instead withholding the information during subsequent discussions and contractual negotiations. The other Dead Kennedys members only learned of the royalty underpayment from a whistleblower at the record label. A 2003 appeal upheld the verdict and judgment against Biafra and the record label of $200,000 in compensation and punitive damages. The result of the case saw the rights to the Dead Kennedys albums turned over to the other band members, who licensed them to Manifesto Records in the United States (and to other labels in the rest of the world). Dead Kennedys albums accounted for about half of all sales by Alternative Tentacles, leading to financial uncertainty for the label.

In October 2002, the label moved to Emeryville, California.

Artists

Current artists
 ArnoCorps
 The Bellrays
 Citizen Fish
 Cross Stitched Eyes
 The Darts
 Dash Rip Rock
 Dead Ending
 Death Hymn Number 9
 Disaster Strikes
 eX-Girl
 Feral Ohms
 itchy-O
 Jello Biafra
 Jello Biafra and the Guantanamo School of Medicine
 Jucifer
 Leftöver Crack
 Legendary Shack Shakers
 Nardwuar the Human Serviette
 Pansy Division
 Pins of Light
 The Silver Machine
 Skarp
 Spindrift
 Subhumans
 Tsunami Bomb
 Turn Me on Dead Man
 Unsane
 Victim's Family
 Witch Hunt
 The World/Inferno Friendship Society

Former artists

 7 Seconds
 Akimbo
 Alice Donut
 Amebix
 Bad Brains
 Beatnigs
 Black Flag
 Black Kali Ma
 BlöödHag
 Blowfly
 BGK
 Brujeria
 Brutal Juice
 Burning Image
 Buzzkill
 Butthole Surfers
 The Causey Way
 Chill Eb
 Christian
 Christian Lunch
 Comets on Fire
 Creeps On Candy
 Crucifucks
 Dead Kennedys
 The Dicks
 D.O.A.
 Doc Corbin Dart
 Dog Faced Hermans
 The Dot Wiggin Band
 Duh
 East Bay Ray
 Eat
 Eugene Chadbourne
 Evan Johns and The H-Bombs
 The Evaporators
 eX-Girl
 F-Minus
 Facepuller
 False Prophets
 The Fartz
 The Flaming Stars
 Fleshies
 Flipper
 Free Beer
 Galloping Coroners (Vágtázó Halottkémek)
 Geza X
 God Bullies
 Grong Grong
 Grotus
 Half Japanese
 Howard Zinn
 Hack 
 The Hanson Brothers
 Hissanol
 Husker Du 
 Jarboe
 Jungle Studs 
 Kepone 
 Klaus Flouride
 Lard
 Les Thugs
 Life After Life
 Logical Nonsense
 The Looters
 Los Gusanos
 Ludicra
 Mat Callahan 
 MDC
 Melvins
 M.I.A.
 Michael Gira
 Mischief Brew
 Mojo Nixon
 Molotov Cocktail
 Nausea
 Neurosis
 Noam Chomsky
 Nomeansno
 No WTO Combo
 Pachinko 
 Part Time Christians
 Peligro
 Pitchshifter
 Porch
 Ratos de Porão
 TARANTELLA
 The Phantom Limbs
 Radiopuhelimet
 Saturn's Flea Collar
 Sibling Rivalry
 The Skatenigs
 Skrapyard
 Slim Cessna's Auto Club
 SNFU
 Star Fucking Hipsters
 Stickdog
 Teddy & the Frat Girls
 Thrall
 Toxic Reasons
 Tragic Mulatto
 Triclops!
 Tribe 8
 Tumor Circus
 T.S.O.L.
 Ultra Bide
 VHK
 Voice Farm
 Ward Churchill
 Wesley Willis
 White Trash Debutants
 The Witch Trials
 The Yuppie Pricks
 Zeni Geva
 Zolar X

Discography
 Alternative Tentacles discography

See also
 List of record labels
 Virus 100

References

Further reading

External links
 Official site

 
Alternative rock record labels
American independent record labels
Companies based in San Francisco
Companies based in Emeryville, California
Punk record labels
Record labels established in 1979
Rock record labels
Spoken word record labels
Music of the San Francisco Bay Area